Madeline Marie Nolf (born March 29, 1996) is an American professional soccer player who plays as a defender for Rangers in the Scottish Women's Premier League (SWPL 1).

Career
She was drafted by Utah Royals FC in the 2019 NWSL College Draft. She remained with the roster when it was transferred to Kansas City NWSL following the dissolution of Utah Royals FC.

On September 20, 2022, Kansas City transferred Nolf to Scottish club Rangers W.F.C. for an undisclosed transfer fee.

Personal life
In June 2018, she married wrestler Jason Nolf.

References

External links
 

1996 births
Living people
American women's soccer players
Utah Royals FC players
National Women's Soccer League players
Utah Royals FC draft picks
Penn State Nittany Lions women's soccer players
United States women's under-20 international soccer players
Kansas City Current players
Women's association football defenders
Rangers W.F.C. players
Scottish Women's Premier League players
Expatriate women's footballers in Scotland
American expatriate sportspeople in Scotland
American expatriate women's soccer players
Soccer players from Nebraska
Sportspeople from Omaha, Nebraska